Mała Góra  is a hamlet in the administrative district of Gmina Niemodlin, within Opole County, Opole Voivodeship, in south-western Poland.

See also 
Boris Malagurski

References

Villages in Opole County